These are the Billboard Hot Dance/Disco Club Play and 12 Inch Singles Sales number-one hits of 1985.

See also
1985 in music
List of number-one dance hits (United States)
List of artists who reached number one on the U.S. Dance chart

References

1985
1985 record charts
1985 in American music